The Joyeuse is a left tributary of the Bidouze, in the French Basque Country (Pyrénées-Atlantiques), in the Southwest of France.

Name 

Its name Joyeuse, that applies also to the Aran and one of its tributaries, is in legend the name of the sword of Charlemagne. It was attributed after the battle of Roncevaux. At this time, many breaches or narrow passes in the Pyrenees were renamed in reference to Roland.

Geography 
The Joyeuse rises in Iholdy and flows into the Bidouze in Saint-Palais.

Départements and towns 
 Pyrénées-Atlantiques: Iholdy, Orsanco, Beyrie-sur-Joyeuse, Saint-Palais.

Main tributaries 
 Azkonbegiko erreka

References

Rivers of France
Rivers of Pyrénées-Atlantiques
Rivers of Nouvelle-Aquitaine